Příběh dušičkový is a 1964 Czechoslovak film. The film starred Josef Kemr.

References

External links
 

1964 films
Czechoslovak comedy films
1960s Czech-language films
Czech comedy films
1960s Czech films